Juan dela Cruz is a 2013 Philippine superhero television series starring Coco Martin. The drama series is broadcast in full high definition and is dubbed to be ABS-CBN's "most expensive and biggest drama" to date.

It is created by Rondel P. Lindayag and Dindo Perez, developed by Julie Anne R. Benitez, Lino S. Cayetano, Ethel M. Espiritu, Dindo Perez, and Shugo Praico, and directed by Malu L. Sevilla, Avel E. Sunpongco, Francis E. Pasion, Jojo A. Saguin, and Darnel Joy R. Villaflor. 

It starred Coco Martin as Juan dela Cruz, a half-tagabantay and half-aswang who was trained to become the next Tagabantay and serves as a hero to protect the people from aswangs. It was the fifth television drama in the Philippines made by ABS-CBN to be filmed in high definition.Erich goes from 'unang aswang' to 'aswang hunter'Juan dela Cruz Teaser The series aired on the network's Primetime Bida evening block and worldwide on The Filipino Channel from February 4, 2013 to October 25, 2013 replacing Princess and I and was replaced by Honesto.

Plot
The Tagabantay (Guardian) is a hero coming from an ancient lineage of defenders using the Bakal na Krus (Iron Cross) to protect the humans from the Aswang, who are strange creatures that appear as ordinary people to hide their real identities; they spread evil, kill, and eat people. The Bakal na Krus transforms into five weapons, namely: Espada ng Katapangan (Sword of Bravery), Pana ng Karunungan (Bow of Wisdom), Latigo ng Katarungan (Whip of Justice), Sibat ng Kagitingan (Spear of Valor), and the Kalasag ng Anking Galing (Shield of Aptitude).

The Aswangs and Tagabantay are mortal enemies. The story begins when Samuel Alejandro (Albert Martinez), the Haring Aswang (King Aswang), plans to make Amelia (Mylene Dizon), a Tagabantay, fall for him so he could kill her and finally provide triumph for his race. However, he falls in love with her as well, betraying his entire race. Upon knowing his secret, Amelia and Samuel try to kill each other but Samuel chooses to escape instead of killing her—even if that’s what he should do as an Aswang.

Bakal na Krus and The Kapatiran 
At 20, he successfully reclaims the Bakal na Krus from the thief, but was still unaware of its use and why it must belong to him. Eventually, Juan turns into a vigilant who seeks to help people in need. Soon, Juan later joins the Kapatiran (Brotherhood), a group composed of people with personal vendettas who seek to destroy the Aswangs. They have been spending years finding and seeking help from the Tagabantay they know, Julian (Eddie Garcia), who is Amelia’s father and Juan’s grandfather. Julian was actually imprisoned for killing Aswangs which the police thought were people. 

One day, Juan accidentally manages to transform the Cross into a sword, making the Kapatiran convinced that he is the present-day Tagabantay for transforming the Cross into weapons only runs in their blood. The group, led by its leader Mang Pepe (Joel Torre), guides and helps train Juan into becoming the next Tagabantay. He also teaches Juan everything that he should know about the war’s history, his duty as a hero, and most importantly, the Haring Aswang—their biggest enemy. Things did not become easy, for Juan constantly shows his mischievous, immature, and unruly behaviour.

Rosario 
While performing his duties as a protector, he falls in love with a 21-year old beautiful woman named Rosario (Erich Gonzales), the same girl he met when he was young. With Rosario, friendship and courtship are very difficult for Juan as he always ends up lying and keeping secrets from her to protect her from his enemies. She is actually the daughter of Kapatiran leader Mang Pepe, whose wife was killed by Juan’s father, Samuel.

The Anak ng Dilim 
After a few weeks, Julian, Juan’s grandfather, escapes from prison to warn Amelia about the new prophecy—the Anak ng Dilim (Son of Darkness) who is set to be the most powerful Aswang to rule the people and the planet and destroy the Tagabantay. Upon returning, Julian finds out that Amelia has died but has a son. He then seeks for his grandson and finds Juan. He introduces himself to him as “Brother Jules”, and secretly watches over Juan in his responsibility as a Tagabantay.  

Eventually, Samuel and Juan meet without knowing their real connection. Knowing that Juan is the vigilant who has excellent skills in warfare, Samuel aims to gain Juan’s trust and to make him join the Aswangs, as he believes that Juan’s skills could be useful to their war with the Kapatiran and Tagabantay. Sooner, Samuel learns to treat Juan as his own son. Similarly, Juan becomes closer to him and treats Samuel as his own father, as he has been longing to find his real father for several years. 

Samuel has started his own family shortly after leaving Amelia. He lives with Laura (Zsa Zsa Padilla), the Reynang Aswang (Aswang Queen) and their son, Kael (Arron Villaflor) who also happens to be Juan’s rival with Rosario. Moreover, Samuel has been preparing Kael for 20 years, as the prophecy states that the Anak ng Dilim is the Haring Aswang’s son: the Aswang Prince. It is revealed that, the Anak ng Dilim’s great power will emerge when he turns 21. 

Finally knowing about the prophecy, the Kapatiran, together with Julian’s guidance, soon start preparing Juan for a huge battle with the Haring Aswang and Anak ng Dilim. When Juan turns 21, everything changed. 

The plot twists as it turns out that the prophesied Anak ng Dilim is not Kael, but is actually the eldest son of the Haring Aswang—Juan.

Juan's fate 
Juan Dela Cruz is a half-Tagabantay and a half-Aswang. He inherited the Bakal na Krus from his mother to protect the humans from the Aswangs and spread peace, justice, and to fulfil his biggest mission—to kill the Haring Aswang and the prophesied Anak ng Dilim. However, since Juan is the eldest son of the Aswang King, he himself is the prophesied Anak ng Dilim, the most powerful Aswang which is set to rule over the entire planet, create the Tatlong Araw ng Kadiliman (Three Days of Darkness), and destroy his mortal enemy: the Tagabantay—which also happens to be him. 

When the truth about Juan’s identity is revealed, difficult choices were made. 

All of them are not victims of love; they are victims of fate.

Cast

Protagonist
 Coco Martin as Juan Dela Cruz / Anak ng Dilim

Main
 Erich Gonzales as Rosario Galang-Dela Cruz / Rosario Guerrero

Supporting

Extended cast

Guests

Special participation

Production
The show was originally a film concept intended to be directed by Richard Somes for the 2012 Metro Manila Film Festival. It was to be topbilled by Coco Martin, Jake Cuenca, Albert Martinez and Maja Salvador. In August 2012, Cinemedia Films Production Incorporated and ABS-CBN Unit Head, Deo Endrinal confirmed that it would be serialised into a television drama to be directed by Malu Sevilla. Earlier reports claimed that Angel Locsin would be Martin's leading lady, after her two-year hiatus in television, but was later replaced by Erich Gonzales.

It is under the production of Dreamscape Entertainment TV managed by Roldeo T. Endrinal and Julie Anne R. Benitez whose projects include the top-rating dramas Ina, Kapatid, Anak and Kailangan Ko'y Ikaw. The drama series is broadcast in full high definition and is dubbed to be the "most expensive and biggest drama" to date. A TV special titled "Juan dela Cruz: Ang Simula (The Beginning)" was aired on February 1, 2013, featuring exclusive behind-the-scenes footage and cast interviews of the highly anticipated drama, hosted by Kim Atienza.

Music

Soundtrack

Other music
Jesse Lasaten and Von Guzman composed the show's background music using choir, duduk, bullroarer, Yamaha GX-1, and other instruments such as the balalaika for the Kapatiran theme in the drama with a full orchestra.
The music was made by the Hollywood Studio Symphony.

Jesse Lasaten, after doing work on the epic historical war film El Presidente, composed the background music of Juan Dela Cruz. He used some instruments such as the bullroarer, didgeridoo, Moog synthesizer, and ocarina to make the show's score.

Reception

Ratings
After 3 weeks of airing, Juan dela Cruz quickly rose to becoming one of the most successful action fantasy-drama of all time registering 42.6% viewership ratings nationwide according to the February 21 data released by Kantar Media.

Awards

My Little Juan 

After the primetime success of Juan dela Cruz, the show was later given a follow-up series called My Little Juan, which tells more about Juan's childhood before he was known as the new Tagabantay. The series premiered on May 20, 2013 and ended on September 13, 2013.

See also
List of programs broadcast by ABS-CBN
List of dramas of ABS-CBN
My Little Juan

References

External links
 
 

ABS-CBN drama series
2013 Philippine television series debuts
2013 Philippine television series endings
Philippine action television series
Fantaserye and telefantasya
Television series by Dreamscape Entertainment Television
Superhero television series
Filipino-language television shows
Television shows set in the Philippines
Philippine mythology in popular culture